Alex Carey may refer to:

 Alex Carey (cricketer) (born 1991), Australian cricketer and former Australian rules footballer
 Alex Carey (writer) (1922–1987), Australian political writer and social psychologist